Herbie, the Love Bug is a fictional sentient 1963 Volkswagen Beetle, who has been featured in several Walt Disney motion pictures starting with the 1968 feature film The Love Bug. Herbie has a mind of his own and is capable of driving himself, and is often a serious contender in auto racing competitions. Throughout most of the franchise, Herbie is distinguished by red, white ,and blue racing stripes from the front to the back bumper, a pearl white body, a racing-style number 53 on the front luggage compartment lid, doors, engine lid, and a yellow-on-black 1963 California license plate with the registration "OFP 857".

History 

In The Love Bug (1968), Herbie is bought from the showroom of Peter Thorndyke (David Tomlinson) by San Francisco socialite Mrs. Van Luit for her upstairs maid, but returns the car shortly afterwards due to reliability problems. Herbie is then purchased by race driver Jim Douglas (Dean Jones) after Douglas was falsely accused of stealing Herbie. Tennessee Steinmetz (Buddy Hackett), Jim's best friend, mechanic and housemate, names the car "Herbie" after his uncle Herb, a middleweight boxer whose nose is shaped like the hood of a Volkswagen Beetle. Jim Douglas and Tennessee soon realize Herbie's sentience and unnatural performance and decide to use him in auto racing, which Herbie proves to be very successful at. In the final race of the film, Herbie is damaged and splits in two, but wins when his rear half (with Tennessee inside) beats Thorndyke's Apollo GT.  The happy ending of the movie involves Herbie being fully repaired and taking the newlyweds Jim and his wife Carole on a romantic getaway, symbolizing a fresh start for all involved.

In Herbie Rides Again (1974), Herbie is retired from racing and has been left to Tennessee's widowed aunt, Mrs. Steinmetz (Helen Hayes). Mrs. Steinmetz and her displaced neighbor, Nicole Harris (Stefanie Powers), try to save her house from being bulldozed by Alonzo Hawk (Keenan Wynn) with the help of Herbie. During the film, it is explained that after several successful races with Herbie, Douglas has entered foreign racing circuits while his sidekick Tennessee resides in Tibet.

In Herbie Goes to Monte Carlo (1977), Jim Douglas is reunited with Herbie and enters him in the Trans-France Race and recruits his mechanic friend Wheely Applegate (Don Knotts) to assist him. Herbie soon falls in love with a Lancia Scorpion named Giselle while Douglas falls in love with Giselle's driver, Diane Darcy (Julie Sommars). Herbie also finds himself in the wrong place at the wrong time when the stolen Etoile de Joie diamond is hidden in his gas tank.

In Herbie Goes Bananas (1980), Douglas has retired from racing and leaves Herbie to his nephew, Pete Stancheck (Stephen W. Burns), who plans to enter Herbie in the Brazil Grand Primeo. In the interim, Herbie befriends an orphan named Paco (Joaquin Garay, III) who gives him the nickname "Ocho", and they both wreak havoc on board the cruise ship Sun Princess, prompting the overzealous Captain Blythe (Harvey Korman) to throw Herbie overboard. Having fallen into the ocean, Herbie is rescued by Paco and while serving as a taxi stops a gang of con artists from stealing ancient Inca gold.

After returning from Mexico, Herbie is taken in by Jim Douglas again and opens a driving school in the TV series Herbie, the Love Bug. There, Douglas meets a woman named Susan MacLane and her three kids: Julie, Matthew, and Robbie, with the kids becoming friends with Herbie while a business man named Randy Bigelow wants to get rid of Herbie and Douglas in order to get Susan back after they broke up during their wedding.

Hank Cooper (Bruce Campbell) becomes the owner of Herbie in the 1997 made-for-television movie The Love Bug. In this film, it is revealed that Herbie's origins come from an elderly German engineer named Dr. Gustav Stumpfel. Stumpfel was building Herbie when a picture of his deceased wife fell into a vat of molten metal; with Stumpfel's love for her animating Herbie. During the film, Stumpfel is forced to build an evil Volkswagen counterpart to Herbie, "Horace the Hate Bug", from a sample of Herbie's original metal. Horace's personality is influenced by the narcissism of Herbie's former owner Simon, and he kills Herbie during the film. Cooper buries Herbie, but the return of Jim Douglas sets Cooper to rebuild the car (with the help of the repentant Dr. Stumpfel) and have him race against Simon and Horace. In this race, Herbie once again splits in half (as in the original film, only lengthwise) to win the race.

In the years leading up to Herbie: Fully Loaded (2005). Herbie is passed down from owner to owner, competing in many races, until he eventually starts losing to newer and faster cars. He is later found in an abandoned garage and carried to Crazy Dave's scrapyard where he is to be junked until he is bought by Maggie Peyton (Lindsay Lohan), who dreams of racing in NASCAR. Maggie quickly discovers that Herbie is sentient, upgrades his engine and bodywork, and takes him in various races, from a demolition derby to the final race of the Nextel Cup Series. In the end of the film, Maggie becomes a NASCAR driver and Herbie builds a relationship with his new love interest, a Volkswagen New Beetle.

Appearance in media

Herbie has been the central character of five theatrical-release films, a made-for-TV movie, and a short-lived television series.

Film series

Television series

A television series, Herbie, the Love Bug, was aired in 1982 on CBS. Dean Jones reprised his role as Jim Douglas for the series.  Five episodes were made.

Other official appearances
 In 1990, Herbie made an appearance in the second season of the 1980s revival of The Mickey Mouse Club.
 An animated version of Herbie made a brief cameo in two episodes of House of Mouse.
 Two racing video games starring Herbie were released by Disney Interactive Studios: Disney's Herbie: Fully Loaded (2005) and Herbie Rescue Rally (2007).
 Herbie used to make an appearance in the Lights, Motors, Action!: Extreme Stunt Show at Disney theme parks, but was later replaced by Lightning McQueen.
 Herbie has had numerous appearances in Disney parades, and has taken part in Disney on Ice, and Disney on Parade, usually in the latter two with painted-on eyes and teeth, along with a moving tongue. This Herbie model has been moved to Disney's All-Star Movies Resort in Walt Disney World and is the centerpiece of 'The Love Bug' themed area.
 Herbie appears in a Disneyland's 50th Anniversary TV commercial where he is used for transportation by Mickey, Goofy, Huey, Dewey, and Louie to get to Disneyland.
 Herbie made a cameo in 2009 Boom! Studios Cars: Radiator Springs comic series as a character in the background.

Unofficial appearances
 Herbie has an unofficial appearance along with Ray Peyton Jr (portrayed by "Fully Loaded" actor Breckin Meyer) in a segment of Robot Chicken titled Horny Robot Redux. In the segment, he is a New Beetle rather than an original Beetle and has animated eyes and a mouth. He also appears in the Kingdom Hearts segment of a season 11 episode.
 Herbie has a brief cameo in episode 195 of American Dad!, "Stan Smith as Keanu Reeves as Stanny Utah in Point Breakers", where he helps Stan Smith escape from poachers and wolves. In the episode, he has incorrect stripes and different 53 font.
 The Herbie film series spawned a knockoff series of Superbug films. A white Beetle, split in half and numbered 53, makes a cameo in the first film of the series, though its name is never mentioned.
 Herbie had a cameo in The Simpsons episode "Beyond Blunderdome" in the Movie Car Museum. 
 Herbie makes an appearance in Forza as a paint job for the 1960s Beetle.
 Two of the liveries available for the "BF Weevil" (The Grand Theft Auto equivalent of the Beetle) in Grand Theft Auto Online are based on Herbie.
 Herbie makes appearances during a race and other scenes of the "First" music video by Lindsay Lohan, a song featured on her debut album and the Herbie: Fully Loaded soundtrack.
 A futuristic version of Herbie appears among the crashed vehicles in Futurama Comics #82.
 Detroit Red Wings defenseman Moritz Seider chose the jersey #53 after watching The Love Bug with his parents the night before.

Future
In 2017, it was reported that a new Herbie series was in development at Disney XD. The plot revolved around a child named Lili or Landon Reed, "part scientist, part entrepreneur, part daredevil" who realizes, "when her/his parents go missing, that they've secretly been working on a government project: a talking car named Herbie. Herbie is key to helping the kid reunite with her/his parents, but a gang of criminals also wants to get its paws on the state-of-the-art vehicle." The concept of this planned series was later developed into Fast Layne without any Herbie references, making Herbie's future uncertain.

Guises and paint schemes 
Herbie's appearance remained consistent throughout the first four film entries as well as the 1982 television series. There were only minor, subtle changes. The 1997 TV movie and Herbie: Fully Loaded featured major overhauls in Herbie's appearance, as there were different production crews working for Disney by this time.

In order to create the effect of Herbie driving himself, Disney concocted a detailed system of sprockets and pulleys connected to a second steering column under the front seat for a rear seat driver. There was also a second set of pedal assemblies, clutch cables and a shifter extension. In The Love Bug, the rear seat driver sat low enough to see over the windshield but still out of the view of the camera. For Herbie Rides Again and Herbie Goes to Monte Carlo, Disney installed a hood-mounted Carello fog light that concealed a small camera which allowed the rear seat driver to view the street and sit lower.

The Love Bug (1968) 

In the original film, The Love Bug, the original racing stripes differ from those in later movies; the stripes do not cover the valances or louvers of the car and the blue is a lighter shade. Also, Herbie features color-keyed running boards, while in later films the running boards are standard black.

During the film, depending on the scene, the wheels change from standard VW wheels (although fitted with plain hubcaps with no VW logo) to specially widened wheels on the racing Herbies. During one scene (when Tennessee is hanging out of the window), the "53" logo (a.k.a. "gumball") on the passenger-side door is missing. The door is also cut along the lower edge at an angle to enable the car to tilt over to the right on two wheels.

One of the modified racing Herbies featured a Porsche 356 engine, brakes and KONI shock absorbers. All Herbies in The Love Bug had the VW badges removed from the hood and featured plain non-VW hubcaps. The hood-mounted VW logo was replaced with a plain disc of the same diameter, colored to match the body. All VW logos were removed to avoid any trademark conflicts.

Herbie Rides Again (1974) 
In Herbie Rides Again, Herbie features revised racing stripes, with the original blue switched to a dark navy. In addition, the stripes were applied over the valances and louvers, and the front hood was recycled for 1982's television series Herbie, the Love Bug. Herbie also received a hood-mounted Carello fog light, and his running boards were now the more conventional black.

Additionally, Herbie was running on standard wheels yet again. Volkswagen also promoted the film by having a Type 1 Beetle, complete with Herbie livery, in every showroom. There are various model errors in this film, such as the later "big window" (post-1964) Beetles being used. Also of note is the "cut-n-shut" engine cover after the warehouse break-in. The Beetle used was a late model, having a more bulbous flat-bottomed lid with an earlier rounded bottom edge welded on.

After the success of The Love Bug, the film was heavily endorsed by Volkswagen, which was in financial trouble at the time, when Beetle sales in North America were considerably lower than in previous decades. As such, the company insisted that the VW logos appear on Herbie. Both the hub cap VW logo and hood-mounted VW logo were reinstated at the company's request.

Herbie Goes to Monte Carlo (1977) 

In Herbie Goes to Monte Carlo, Herbie is again fitted with wide racing wheels (Goodyear GT radials), and has an external fuel filler cap. Post-1967 Beetles did feature the fuel tank accessible on the right side behind the fender; the silver cap itself, however, was fake and added for the film's storyline. With the addition of the fuel filler, the antenna is now a retractable unit fitted on the front cowling, near the windshield wipers. He has a roll cage again, and he has Monte Carlo racing stickers on his windows (one on the front window, two on the left back window, and one on the rear window). Herbie still sports the hood-mounted Carello fog light with an added black cover sporting the company name. He now has gray bucket seats instead of stitched seats. Throughout this film, Herbie has an asymmetrical door mirror. There were a total of 9 VWs used in Herbie Goes to Monte Carlo. Many of these cars were recycled for use in Herbie Goes Bananas.

Herbie Goes Bananas (1980) 
In Herbie Goes Bananas, the hood-mounted light, the grey roll cage bar, the Monte Carlo racing stickers and the silver gas cap were removed. He still had his gray bucket seats, asymmetrical door mirror and his Goodyear GT Radial racing tires and rims, and Herbie's sunroof was the original light gray rather than the dark gray from Monte Carlo. The rust seen on the car in this film was painted on some of the Herbies. The car that "walks the plank" in the movie was never recovered from the sea. It was tossed overboard from the "M.N. Coromuel" ferry ship (not The Sun Princess cruise ship). The car is somewhere between La Paz and Baja California. The car thrown overboard was not a proper car and had many wooden parts.

Herbie Goes Bananas also featured the same later model door mirror as Herbie Goes to Monte Carlo. Herbie set a Guinness World Record as the first car to go through the Panama Canal during filming in 1979. Herbie's name is only mentioned 3 times in the film by the garage owner, apart from the two times Herbie honks his horn at Paco trying to say his name when Paco couldn't understand what Herbie was saying.

Some of these Herbie cars were recycled for Herbie, the Love Bug in 1982.

One of the actual film cars used with its flip wheel chassis in the bullfighting scenes now resides in Sydney, Australia. Another one was displayed in the Cars of the Stars Motor Museum until the museum's closure in 2011. Since then its new location remains unknown.

Volkswagen ceased the sale of Beetles in the USA one year before the film's release.

The Love Bug (1997) 

In The Love Bug television film there were some significant changes. The graphics used were copied from the 1974 Volkswagen of America decal kit, and the position on the front hood 53 was higher up. The racing stripes were different sizes, and the shade of blue reverted to the lighter version used in the original 1968 movie. The sunroof was a solid white (vs. gray) and was missing the racing stripes. Herbie's wheels were standard Beetle wheels, instead of the wider GoodYear GT Radial racing tires used in Herbie Goes to Monte Carlo and Herbie Goes Bananas, and the seats were regular instead of the gray bucket seats he had previously had.

Herbie: Fully Loaded (2005)

In Herbie: Fully Loaded, Herbie, who in this film seemed to be able to show emotions through anthropomorphized expressions mimicking a face, went through several "costume changes" throughout the movie, changing his style dramatically from scene to scene.

 The font of the 53 is different, and it is slightly bigger and lower down on the front hood. The racing stripe is missing from the sunroof and the stripes are painted the way they were in the first four Herbie movies. Herbie's front license plate is not present on his front bumper anymore.
 For the "street racer" look, Herbie has brighter white paint, a whale-tail rear spoiler, air intakes in the front of the rear fenders, lowered suspension, no rear bumper, wider tires and a windowed rear engine cover through which blue LED lighting show. He is also shown to have a nitrous oxide system to boost his speed during the race against Trip Murphy.
 During the demolition derby, Herbie is stripped down with no vehicle interior panels,  vehicle racing seats or special street racing body parts. The sunroof cover has been removed, although the cutout remains to play important roles during the demolition derby. He still retains the same 53 logos on the sides that he wore in his street race look except with Targets or Bullseyes Sprayed over the Logos and the white paint and all vehicular modifications in his Street Racer Version were all dismantled and completely thrown away for good. He later gets red Bull's-eye targets spray-painted on his front doors and hood by Crash.
 For the "NASCAR" look, Herbie gets a new, more off-white paint job, NASCAR sponsor decals, a different duck-tail rear spoiler, a roll cage, Goodyear Eagle NASCAR tires, wider fenders, no front turn signals, no back bumper, no passenger seat, & no back seat.

More than 30 different Herbies were used during the shooting of this film, and three original cars are known to be on display. There is one at the Volo Auto Museum in Illinois and two other vehicles in California, one fully motorized is preserved at the Peterson Automotive Museum and a “personality car” at the hobby store Electric Dreams. Both California cars were used during the NASCAR racing segment of the film.

References 

Disney characters originating in film
Fictional anthropomorphic characters
Fictional German American people
Fictional racing cars
Fictional racing drivers
 
Volkswagen vehicles
Film characters introduced in 1968
Volkswagen Beetle
Cars designed and produced for films
Films adapted into television shows
Cars powered by boxer engines

it:Un maggiolino tutto matto